Galaxidiotika was an old neighbourhood in the city of Patras. Many residents came from Galaxidi, a town in Phocis in Central Greece, hence the origin of its name.

References
 Κώστας Ν. Τριανταφύλλου, Ιστορικόν Λεξικόν των Πατρών, Τόμος A', Τυπογραφείο Πέτρου Χρ. Κούλη, Πάτρα 1995, Τρίτη Έκδοση, λήμμα "Γαλαξιδιώτικα" (in Greek)

Note
The first version of the article is translated from the article at the Greek Wikipedia (el:Main Page)

Neighborhoods in Patras